The siege of Plymouth took place during the First English Civil War, when Royalist forces besieged Plymouth, in Devon, held by a Parliamentary garrison.

With the exception of a brief interlude in July 1644, the town was isolated for most of the period from August 1642 to January 1646; however, control of the sea meant the garrison could easily be resupplied.

The Royalists recognised this made its capture extremely difficult, and they generally restricted operations to a land blockade. However, there were two serious attempts to capture the town; the first, from October to December 1643, the second, January to February 1645. The town was finally relieved in February 1646.

Background

When the war began in August 1642, Parliamentary forces secured most of southern and western England, including the ports of Plymouth and Exeter, and the bulk of the Royal Navy. This prevented Royalist efforts to import arms and men from Europe.

Shortly after the war began in August 1642, Plymouth was cut off by Royalist forces, who set up their headquarters in nearby Plymstock. They prevented supplies being brought in by land, and blocked the supply of fresh water; with refugees increasing the population to over 10,000, this caused the spread of disease, including typhus. However, the Royalist army lacked the means to take it by force, and a messenger asking the town to surrender was turned away and told never to return.  Reinforcements were sent to Plymouth by sea, and every man in the town was required to swear an oath to defend the town to the last.

By the end of September 1642, Devon was held by Parliament, while Royalists under Sir Ralph Hopton secured Cornwall. In the early stages of the war, most soldiers on both sides were poorly trained and equipped militia. An exception was Plymouth, where the garrison was commanded by Colonel William Ruthven, and a contingent of experienced Scots mercenaries; their ship stopped to pick up supplies returning from Ireland in early October, and the Parliamentary town council hired them to defend the city.

Parliamentary control of the Royal Navy made Plymouth largely impregnable from the sea, and allowed them to bring in supplies and reinforcements as needed. The garrison constructed defences on high ground to the north, strengthening it against attack from the land; strongpoints were constructed at Lipson, Holiwell, Maudlyn, Pennycomequick and New Worke. Additional self-supporting forts at Lipson Mill and Stonehouse prevented the town from being fired on from the land, making its capture very difficult.

In June 1643, Hopton inflicted a serious defeat on Waller's 'Army of the Southern Association' at Roundway Down on 13 July. Arguably the most comprehensive Royalist victory of the war, it isolated Parliamentary garrisons in the west. On 26 July, Prince Rupert stormed Bristol, gaining the second largest city in Britain, and a landing point for reinforcements from Ireland. Exeter surrendered to Prince Maurice on 4 September, leaving Plymouth as the main Parliamentary enclave in the West Country.

Royalist success led to a series of defections, including Sir Alexander Carew, commander of St Nicholas' Island, now known as Drake's Island. This was a key defensive position, since the Royalist capture of Mount Batten prevented ships entering the main harbour; in August, Carew ordered his men to open fire on a Parliamentary warship entering the harbour. They refused, and he allegedly only escaped lynching when the ship's captain intervened; taken to London, he was executed for treason in December 1644.

1643 Siege
Rather than attacking Plymouth immediately, Prince Maurice first captured Dartmouth, which held out until early October. Although Royalist cavalry imposed a land blockade on 15 September, siege operations did not begin until mid-October, allowing London to send 500 reinforcements, under Colonel James Wardlow, an experienced professional who became garrison commander.

On 21 October, the Royalists began preparing an attack on Fort Stamford, an isolated position constructed on a peninsula, which they thought commanded Plymouth Sound. Despite a series of delaying actions by the Parliamentary garrison, the fort was captured on 5 November, but the Royalists gained little from their victory. Cannon placed in Mount Stamford could not stop ships entering Plymouth Sound, and resupplying the town, while abandoning these fortifications reduced the strain on the garrison.

Further attacks were easily repulsed, the most serious being on 3 December; led by a local guide, the Royalists took advantage of low tide to capture an outpost at Laira Point. Reinforcements attempted to retake it, but were forced to retreat to what is now 'Freedom Fields Park', where they held their ground for several hours. This allowed additional Parliamentary troops to be assembled; outnumbered, the Royalists retreated, but much of their rearguard was cut off by the incoming tide. The siege was lifted on 25 December, although the Royalists retained Fort Stamford, and continued the blockade.

Post 1643
In January 1644, Wardlaw was replaced as commander by Colonel Gould; the blockade was lifted for a short period in July, when the Earl of Essex brought his army into the South West. Gould died in July, and Colonel Martin took over, instituting a policy of constantly attacking Royalist outposts.

After defeating Essex at Lostwithiel in September 1644, the main Royalist army from Oxford under Charles I arrived outside Plymouth, and demanded its surrender. Since Parliament still controlled the sea, they were able to provide supplies and reinforcements, including a regiment led by the experienced and aggressive Colonel John Birch. This allowed the garrison to refuse terms and with the Royalist army urgently needed elsewhere, Charles left only a minor force under Sir Richard Grenville to continue the blockade.

Grenville launched a major attack in January 1645 which captured some of the outlying defensive forts but was beaten off, and in February the garrison retook Mount Batten, which signalled the end of serious efforts to capture the town. The blockade finally ended in December 1645, when the New Model Army arrived in the West.

Citations

Sources

 
 
 
 
 
 
 
 
 
 

History of Plymouth, Devon
Conflicts in 1643
Plymouth
17th century in Devon
Military history of Devon